Utopía is the fourth studio album by American singer Romeo Santos, released on April 5, 2019 by Sony Music Latin. This album featured collaborations with some of the greatest artist in the history of Bachata. It also included the reunion of Aventura as Romeo along with Henry, Lenny, and Max would release their first single as a group in 10 years.

Singles
The album was supported by the successful singles: "Inmortal" by Aventura, "La Demanda" with Raulín Rodríguez, "Payasos" with Frank Reyes, "Canalla" with El Chaval de la Bachata, "Millonario" with Elvis Martínez, "Me Quedo" with Zacarías Ferreira, "Ileso" with Teodoro Reyes, "Amor Enterrado" with Joe Veras, "El Beso Que No Le Di" with Kiko Rodríguez, "Años Luz" with Monchy & Alexandra and "Los Últimos" with Luis Vargas. It features guest appearances on every full length track. Every song has its own music video except for the song "Bellas". It might be because it is the only track not owned by Romeo as it belongs to Anthony Santos. Romeo was a featured artist, but the song was not his. Also, it was originally released as a single in 2018 for Anthony Santos' twenty-third studio album, La Historia De Mi Vida: El Final, Vol. 1.

Promotion and tour
To promote the album, Santos performed a single concert in the United States at the MetLife Stadium in East Rutherford, New Jersey in front of 80,000 fans on September 21, 2019. It broke the record for the biggest audience to attend the venue, surpassing U2. It was later announced that Santos would embark on a tour of the Dominican Republic called Utopia: La Gira del Pueblo, with Santos explaining that the tour would visit cities he had not previously performed in. The tour consisted of 15 free concerts in 15 different towns and cities between November and December 2019.

In December 2019, Santos announced a reunion tour with Aventura called the Inmortal Tour. It was the band's first American tour since 2009, when they held their tour in support of The Last.

Commercial performance
The album was a commercial success across the United States, Latin America and Europe.

In the United States, the album debuted atop the Billboard Top Latin Albums and Top Tropical Albums charts, becoming Santos' fifth consecutive number-one album on both charts. The album debuted at number eighteen on the Billboard 200, selling 24,000 units in its first week, making it the biggest first week sales of a Latin album released in 2019. On August 20, 2020, the album was certified five-times platinum (Latin) for moving 300,000 units in the United States.

Track listing

 The intro is a cover of Fernando Villalona's "Dominicano Soy".
 Tracks 3 to 12 were also written by Joaquin Diaz.
 Tracks 8 and 11 were also written by Phillip L. Jackson

Charts

Weekly charts

Year-end charts

Certifications

References

2019 albums
Romeo Santos albums
Sony Music Latin albums